Shelton is a city in Fairfield County, Connecticut, United States. The population was 40,869 at the 2020 United States Census.

History

Origins
Shelton was settled by the English as part of the town of Stratford, Connecticut, in 1639. In 1662, Stratford selectmen Lt. Joseph Judson, Captain Joseph Hawley and John Minor had secured all the written deeds of transfer from the Golden Hill Paugussett Indian Nation for this vast territory that comprises the present-day towns of Trumbull, Shelton and Monroe. Shelton was split off from Stratford in 1789, as Huntington (named for Samuel Huntington).
The current name originated in a manufacturing village started in the 1860s named for the Shelton Company founded by Edward N. Shelton—also founder of Ousatonic Water Power Company.
The rapidly growing borough of Shelton incorporated as a city in 1915 and was consolidated with the town of Huntington in 1919 establishing the present city of Shelton.

Decline of Shelton's industry
Shelton was the site of one of the largest arson fires in the United States history. It happened in 1975 when the Sponge Rubber Products plant (formerly owned by B.F. Goodrich) was set on fire. Charles Moeller, president of parent company Grand Sheet Metal Products, was acquitted of criminal charges, but in a suit under civil law (where  preponderance of evidence suffices to establish a factual claim), a jury found in 1988 the insurer was entitled to disallow claims on the fire losses, based on the finding that the company's top officials arranged the fire to claim insurance money. Eight others were convicted or pleaded guilty.

The explosion that destroyed the Sponge Rubber Plant on Canal Street in 1975 marked the start of the decline of Shelton's industries. During the remainder of the 1970s and 1980s several firms that operated factories along the banks of the Housatonic River either went out of business or relocated to areas where labor and operating costs were cheaper. In 1995, Sikorsky Aircraft closed a plant off Bridgeport Avenue that manufactured electrical components for helicopters.

Rise of Shelton's office space
With the completion of Route 8, new office spaces and businesses were attracted to the town, due to its Fairfield County location coupled with low costs of doing business as opposed to places such as Stamford or Greenwich. Major firms such as Tetley Tea, TIE Communication, I.T.T., Black and Decker, Sikorsky Aircraft, Gama  Aviation, Chesebrough-Pond's, Tetra-Pak, General Electric, and Bunker Ramo. Over  of corporate office space spread across 12 buildings was constructed by the R.D. Scinto corporation alone.

Downtown revitalization

Efforts are underway to restore nineteenth-century industrial buildings in the downtown area; those that were beyond repair were demolished in the late 1990s and early 2000s and replaced with the Veteran's Memorial and a farmer's market.  The  Riverwalk Park next to the Veterans Memorial was created on the site of the former Sponge Rubber Plant.  Other buildings along Howe Avenue, one of the city's main thoroughfares, have been restored, while developers have renovated two 19th-century factory buildings on Bridge Street, converting them into luxury condominiums.  Several downtown streets have been reconstructed as part of a streetscape improvement project:  sidewalks were reconstructed with brick and cobblestone, trees were planted, and some power lines were rerouted underground to improve the appearance of Shelton's central business district.  In March 2008, Connecticut Governor M. Jodi Rell announced that after negotiations with State Senator Dan Debicella and State Representative Jason Perillo, state bond funds in the amount of $2 million would be directed toward additional infrastructure improvements.

Other events

In November 2007, a tree growing on Soundview Avenue in Shelton was selected and felled to be the Rockefeller Center Christmas tree.

On May 30, 2008, producers and staff for the upcoming movie All Good Things shot one scene on Canal St. in downtown Shelton. The scene was underneath the train trestle and involved one of the characters dragging a body and dumping it into the Housatonic River.

On July 31, 2009, a line of heavy thunderstorms with weak rotation spawned an EF1 tornado, which touched down with wind speeds between 95 and 105 miles per hour. According to WTNH, the most concentrated damage was along the Oronoque Trail, where many trees were blown down. There were no injuries or fatalities.

In November 2013, a tree located on Kazo Drive was picked to be the second Rockefeller Center Christmas tree from Shelton.

Geography

Neighborhoods
Downtown
Coram Gardens
White Hills
Soundview Avenue
South End
Booth Hill Road
Bridgeport Avenue
Huntington
Pine Rock Park
Long Hill

Demographics

As of the census of 2000, there were 38,101 people, 14,190 households, and 10,543 families residing in the city. The racial makeup of the city was 94.44% White, 1.12% Black or African American, 0.15% Native American, 2.08% Asian, 0.89% from other races, and 1.31% from two or more races. Hispanic or Latino of any race were 3.48% of the population.

There were 14,190 households, out of which 32.8% had children under the age of 18 living with them, 62.9% were married couples living together, 8.5% had a female householder with no husband present, and 25.7% were non-families. 21.8% of all households were made up of individuals, and 9.2% had someone living alone who was 65 years of age or older.  The average household size was 2.65 and the average family size was 3.11.

In the city, the population was spread out, with 23.5% under the age of 18, 5.8% from 18 to 24, 30.0% from 25 to 44, 25.7% from 45 to 64, and 14.9% who were 65 years of age or older.  The median age was 40 years. For every 100 females, there were 93.8 males.  For every 100 females age 18 and over, there were 90.3 males.

The median income for a household in the city was $67,292, and the median income for a family was $75,523 (these figures had risen to $80,694 and $94,485 respectively as of a 2007 estimate). Males had a median income of $50,210 versus $36,815 for females. The per capita income for the city was $29,893.  About 2.5% of families and 3.2% of the population were below the poverty line, including 3.2% of those under age 18 and 5.5% of those age 65 or over.

Government and politics

Republican Mark Lauretti has served as mayor since taking office in 1991.

The Republican Party has controlled the city government since the 1980s. Before the 2007 Elections, the Board of Aldermen consisted of five Republican members, two Citizens' United members, and one Democratic member. Mayor Lauretti was re-elected for a fourteenth term on November 7, 2017. The current Board of Aldermen consists entirely of eight Republicans.

Political representation at the state level has been Republican since the 1960s. Republican State Senator Kevin Kelly of Stratford replaced Senator Dan Debicella in 2010 after Debicella sought election to the U.S. Congress. There are two State Assembly districts that cover Shelton. In 2007, Republican State Representative Jason Perillo of the 113th District took office. He won in a special election following the death of Richard O. Belden, who had represented the town for 32 years. Republican State Representative Ben McGorty of the 122nd District took office after winning a special election in 2014 following the death of previous State Representative Larry Miller.

At the federal level, Shelton is represented by Democratic U.S. Senators Richard Blumenthal and Chris Murphy in the United States Senate, along with the rest of the state. Representation of Shelton in the U.S. House of Representatives is split between the 3rd and 4th congressional districts, which are represented by Democratic U.S. Representatives Rosa DeLauro and Jim Himes, respectively. The boundary between the two congressional districts lies roughly along Route 8; Himes represents the portion of the city to the north and west of Route 8 while DeLauro represents sections of Shelton to the south and east.

Shelton is a Republican stronghold in presidential elections, as the city has voted for the GOP presidential nominee in every election since 1964 when Lyndon B. Johnson carried the municipality in his landslide election.

Sheriff

Shelton is one of the few municipalities in Connecticut with its own sheriff's department, the Shelton Sheriff's Department. The sheriff's department, which is distinct from the police department, is responsible for serving legal process within the city of Shelton. The Fairfield County Sheriff's Department had a similar role before it and all other county sheriffs in Connecticut were abolished in 2000. The Shelton Sheriff's Department is not a law enforcement agency. Members are political appointees and receive no salary and derive income from fees charged to serve legal papers.  the head of the department is Sheriff Carl Sylvester.

Landscape, geology, and natural environment
The City of Shelton's goal is to preserve at least 15% of the land as permanently protected, locally controlled open space in the following three forms: City of Shelton Public Open Space properties, Privately owned farmland protected by the purchase of development rights, and properties held by the non-profit Shelton Land Conservation Trust.

There is opportunity for fishing, boating, geocaching and letterboxing, hiking, walking and biking. Dogs are welcomed when on leash. There is no hunting on city-owned open space, by ordinance.

Education
Shelton Public Schools include Shelton High School for grades 9 through 12, Shelton Intermediate School for grades 7 and 8. Perry Hill School for grades 5 and 6, and five primary schools for pre-kindergarten through fourth grade, including Elizabeth Shelton Elementary, Mohegan Elementary School, Long Hill Elementary School, Booth Hill Elementary School, and Sunnyside Elementary School.

Fire department
The City of Shelton is protected by the 246-member all-volunteer Shelton Fire Department, which consists of four companies operating out of four stations located throughout the city. There is also a board of fire commissioners with a representative from each company.

Recreation
There are two private golf courses in town Highland Golf Club of Shelton is located in the downtown Shelton area where it was founded in 1900. It is a 9-hole course (with 10 greens to allow alternating #2 and #11 where the tee shot goes over Perry Hill Road) in which an unknown original designer created difficult greens.  The clubhouse's 1920s era structure still remains as the core to the current structure.  Brownson Country Club is an 18-hole venue located in the Huntington section of Shelton.  There is an annual competition between the clubs for the "Mayor's Trophy", alternating the venue each year.  The 2009 Champion and holder of the Trophy is Highland.

Notable companies

 Bic Corporation conducts U.S. operations from Shelton
 Cartier SA has an office in Shelton
 Computershare (formerly Transcentive, Inc.), 2 Enterprise Drive
 Hubbell Incorporated is headquartered in Shelton, 40 Waterview Drive
 NEC Unified Solutions (formerly Nitsuko America), manufacturer of business telephone systems, 4 Forest Parkway
 PerkinElmer, Inc. houses their Life and Analytical sciences division on Bridgeport Avenue.  PerkinElmer, formerly Perkin-Elmer Instruments, is best known for building the optical components of the Hubble Space Telescope.
 Pitney Bowes employs 1,460 in the city
 Prudential Annuities headquarters
 Sikorsky Aircraft Corporation has an Overhaul and Repair (O&R) facility in Shelton

Notable people

 Helen Barnes (1895–1925), Ziegfeld Follies Girl
 Dan Debicella (born 1974), the only State Senator (2006–2010) from Shelton since World War II
 Peter Leo Gerety (1912–2016), Roman Catholic bishop
 Doug Henry (born 1969), Motocross Hall of Famer
 Isaac Hull (1773–1843), Commodore in the U.S. Navy; commanded  among other ships
 Dan Orlovsky (born 1983), Former NFL Quarterback, grew up in Shelton

On the National Register of Historic Places

 Commodore Hull School: 130 Oak Ave. (added July 30, 1983)
 Huntington Center Historic District: Roughly along Church and Huntington Sts., from Ripton Rd. to the Farmill River (added April, 2000)
 Plumb Memorial Library: 65 Wooster St. (added December 7, 1978)

Media
The Valley Independent Sentinel, an online-only, non-profit news site, launched in June 2009, thanks to the efforts of The Valley Community Foundation and The Knight Foundation.

Shelton also has a weekly newspaper, the Shelton Herald. The Connecticut Post and the New Haven Register also cover the city. Both are daily papers.

References

Further reading
Reverend Samuel Orcutt, History of the Old Town of Stratford and the City of Bridgeport Connecticut, Fairfield County Historical Society, 1886

External links

City of Shelton official website Portal style website, Government, Business, Library, Recreation and more
Shelton Historical Society
City-Data.com Comprehensive Statistical Data and more about Shelton

 
Cities in Connecticut
Naugatuck River Valley
Populated places established in 1789
Cities in the New York metropolitan area
Cities in Fairfield County, Connecticut
1789 establishments in Connecticut